This is a list of electricity-generating power stations in Minnesota, sorted by type and name. In 2020, Minnesota had a total summer capacity of 17,944 MW through all of its power plants, and a net generation of 56,510 GWh.  The corresponding electrical energy generation mix in 2021 was 26.5% coal, 23.7% nuclear, 21.7% wind, 20.6% natural gas, 3.2% solar, 2.2% biomass (including most refuse-derived fuels), and 1.5% hydroelectric. Waste-heat recovery and petroleum generated most of the remaining 0.6%.

Small-scale solar, which includes customer-owned photovoltaic panels, delivered an additional net 179 GWh to Minnesota's electrical grid in 2021. This was less than one-tenth the amount generated by the state's utility-scale photovoltaic plants. Independent power producers accounted for more than one-fifth of all generation, especially by harnessing wind in the state's southwestern region. Minnesotans have recently consumed more electricity each year than has been produced in-state.

Nuclear power stations

Fossil-fuel power stations 
Data from the U.S. Energy Information Administration serves as a general reference.

Coal 

 Minnesota Power intends to transition the 468-megawatt Boswell Unit 4 off coal, which could mean a switch to natural gas, biomass or other sources.

 Minnesota Power lists the M L Hibbard plant as operating with a mix of bio-mass and coal

Natural gas & Petroleum

Renewable power stations 
Data from the U.S. Energy Information Administration serves as a general reference.

Wind

Solar

Hydroelectric

Biomass

Refuse

References

External links
Minnesota Energy Profile
DOE EIA Inventory of Electric Utility Power Plants in the United States 2000

Power stations
Minnesota